Si-Mustapha is a town and commune in the Isser District of Boumerdès Province, Algeria. According to the 1998 census it has a population of 9,015.

Previously named Blad Guitoune ("land of the tent"), it was renamed Félix-Faure in 1899 during the colonial period, after the former French president Félix Faure.  After independence in 1962, it was given the new name of Si Mustapha, after the nom de guerre of the ALN fighter Mohamed Saoudi, who died nearby in combat on 25 November 1958.

A 4th century octagonal mausoleum formerly found there was demolished in 1905.

History
 First Battle of the Issers (1837)

Notable people

 Mohamed Aïchaoui (1921-1959), an Algerian journalist and resistant against French colonization.

Notes

References
 Rabah Boumriche, La guerre de Libération dans la région de Si Mustapha, Legata, Koudiat El Araïs, Zemmouri, Zaatra (1954-1962), édition à compte d’auteur, Alger 2015, 746 pages. (review)

Communes of Boumerdès Province
Cities in Algeria
Algeria